The term victory (from Latin victoria) originally applied to warfare, and denotes success achieved in personal combat, after military operations in general or, by extension, in any competition. Success in a military campaign constitutes a strategic victory, while the success in a military engagement is a tactical victory.

In terms of human emotion, victory accompanies strong feelings of elation, and in human behaviour often exhibits movements and poses paralleling threat display preceding the combat, which are associated with the excess endorphin built up preceding and during combat.
Victory dances and victory cries similarly parallel war dances and war cries performed before the outbreak of physical violence.

Examples of victory behaviour reported in Roman antiquity, where the term victoria originated, include: the victory songs of the Batavi mercenaries serving under Gaius Julius Civilis after the victory over Quintus Petillius Cerialis in the Batavian rebellion of 69 AD (according to Tacitus); and also the "abominable song" to Wodan, sung by the Lombards at their victory celebration in 579. The sacrificial animal was a goat, around whose head the Langobards danced in a circle while singing their victory hymn.
The Roman Republic and Empire celebrated victories with triumph ceremonies and with monuments such as victory columns (e.g. Trajan's Column) and arches. A trophy is a token of victory taken from the defeated party, such as the enemy's weapons (spolia), or body parts (as in the case of head hunters).

Mythology often deifies victory, as in the cases of the Greek Nike or the Roman Victoria. The victorious agent is a hero, often portrayed as engaging in hand-to-hand combat with a monster (as Saint George slaying the dragon, Indra slaying Ahi, Thor slaying the Midgard Serpent etc.). Sol Invictus ("the Invincible Sun") of Roman mythology became an epithet of Christ in Christianity. Paul of Tarsus presents the resurrection of Christ as a victory over Death and Sin (1 Corinthians 15:55).

The Latinate English-language word victory (from the 14th century) replaced the Old English equivalent term sige (cognate with Gothic sigis, Old High German sigu and Sieg in modern German), a frequent element in Germanic names (as in Sigibert, Sigurd etc.), cognate to Celtic sego and Sanskrit sahas.

The universal sign for victory
The age-old "V sign" comes in two formats: one with the palm faced outwards, and one with the palm inwards. In the United States, the two hand signals mean the same thing – "victory".

Religion
Buddha emphasized the immortality that exists within ourself, to act to conquer ourself is his victory and ours; "It is better to conquer yourself than to win a thousand battles. Then the victory is yours. It cannot be taken from you, not by angels or by demons, heaven or hell." Buddha's victory is ours, it rests forever in the seat of the mind, unfolding in numerous lives.

In Ch.2 Verse 38 of the Bhagavad Gita equanimity is ordained by Krishna, speaking to Arjuna; "Know That, by which all this (universe) is pervaded, to be indestructible. No one can destroy the indestructible (Atma)." and later Krishna states after instructing Arjuna to act with newly found clarity "Treating alike victory and defeat, gain and loss, pleasure and pain, Get ready for the battle. Fighting thus you will not incur sin." Sin-virtue are matters of the mind, and aren't of the body.

In the New Testament, the victory of Jesus Christ over death and the sharing of that victory with the Christian believer are referred to in the writings of Saint Paul and Saint John (e.g. 1 Corinthians 15:57, 1 John 5:4).

See also

Aggression
Competition (biology)
Conquest (military)
Endsieg
Fight-or-flight response
Human aggression
Pyrrhic victory
Surrender (military)
Victoria Memorial, London
Victory, 1902 statue in New York City by Augustus Saint-Gaudens
Victory Day
War
Winged Victory of Samothrace

References

External links

Victory: Definition, Idea and Phenomenon

 
Articles containing video clips